Minus Verheijen (18 November 1889 – 6 October 1955) was a Dutch weightlifter. He competed in the men's heavyweight event at the 1928 Summer Olympics.

References

1889 births
1955 deaths
Dutch male weightlifters
Olympic weightlifters of the Netherlands
Weightlifters at the 1928 Summer Olympics
Sportspeople from Limburg (Netherlands)
20th-century Dutch people